Robert Bengsch (born ) is a German track cyclist, riding for the national team. He competed at the 2007, 2010 and 2011 UCI Track Cycling World Championships.

Major results

Road
2001
1st Stage 1 Coupe du Président de la ville de Grudziądz
2008
1st Overall Tour Alsace
1st Stage 3
2010
1st Stage 4 Tour of Bulgaria

References

External links
 Profile at cyclingarchives.com

1983 births
Living people
German track cyclists
German male cyclists
Place of birth missing (living people)
Sportspeople from Frankfurt (Oder)
People from Bezirk Frankfurt
Cyclists from Brandenburg